The Bank of Upper India (1863) was a bank founded in the year 1863 in British India. The bank became defunct in the year 1913, when it was acquired by the Alliance Bank of Simla.

History

Founding  

The Bank of Upper India was founded in 1863.

The bank was mentioned several times in British Parliamentary debates.

Management 

The bank was staffed by mostly British nationals who were drawn mainly from the East India Company.

The bank was headquartered in Meerut city in the United Provinces.

Final years 

In 1911, the bank was on the verge of failure and it was decided to merge the bank with the Alliance Bank of Simla.

In 1913, the bank was finally merged with the Alliance Bank of Simla.

Legacy 

The bank is notable for being the one of the oldest banks in India.

The bank is also notable for being one of the precursors of the State Bank of India, through its predecessor the Alliance Bank of Simla.

See also

Indian banking
List of banks in India

References

External links
 Legal History
 History of the Bank

Defunct banks of India
Companies based in Meerut
Banks established in 1863